Zhanggong is a town under the administration of Yilong County, Sichuan, China. , it has one residential community and 13 villages under its administration.

References

Towns in Sichuan
Yilong County